Michael Pope may refer to:
 Michael Pope (filmmaker), American filmmaker
 Michael Pope (producer), Australian television presenter and producer
 Michael Pope (athlete), British hurdler
 Michael T. Pope, chemist